The 1995 season is the 73rd season of competitive football in Ecuador.

National leagues

Serie A
Champion: Barcelona (12th title)
International cup qualifiers:
1996 Copa Libertadores: Barcelona, ESPOLI
1996 Copa CONMEBOL: Emelec
Relegated: Delfín, 9 de Octubre

Serie B
Winner: Deportivo Cuenca (2nd title)
Promoted: Deportivo Cuenca, Técnico Universitario
Relegated: Valdez, Flamengo

Segunda
Winner: Imbabura (1st title)
Promoted: Imbabura, Santa Rita

Clubs in international competitions

National teams

Senior team
The Ecuador national team played 10 matches in 1995: three at the Copa América, and seven friendlies, including two at the Kirin Cup and three at the Korea Cup.

Copa América

For the 1995 Copa America, held in Uruguay, Ecuador was drawn into Group B with Colombia, Brazil, and Peru. They finished third in their group, as well as the third best third-place team, and were eliminated after the Group Stage.

Friendlies

Kirin Cup
Ecuador participated in the 1995 Kirin Cup against Japan and Scotland. Japan won the competition, with Ecuador finishing in third.

Korea Cup
Ecuador participated in the 1995 Korea Cup, a friendly international tournament used to help train the South Korean national team. Ecuador won the competition.

External links
 National leagues details on RSSSF

 
1995